The Amahuaca or Amhuaca are indigenous peoples of the southeastern Amazon Basin in  Peru and Brazil. Isolated until the 18th century, they are currently under threat from ecological devastation, disease and violence brought by oil extractors and illegal loggers. In 1998, they numbered about 520. The largest community of the Amahuaca is in Puerto Varadero, a jungle community on the Peruvian–Brazilian border.

Ayahuasca 
The Amahuaca are one group of the Amazon that uses a drug called ayahuasca. They believe that Ayahuasca gives them supernatural powers, sending them into a state of mind that makes them feel superhuman.

History 
The Amahuaca are desentants of the Polynesian populations that might have migrated to the Pacific coast of South America. When they were first sighted in the 18th century, they were threatened by illegal logging, diseases and habitat loss.

Name
The Amahuaca are also known as: Amaguaco, Amawaca, Amawáka, Amawaka, Amenguaca, Ameuhaque, Ipitineri, Sayaco, Sayacu, or Yora people. In the early twentieth century they were sometimes referred to as the Huni Kui.

Language
As of 2000, approximately 220 Amahuaca spoke the Amahuaca language, a Panoan language. The language is written in the Latin script, and a grammar has been published. From 1963 to 1997, portions of the Bible were translated into Amahuaca.

Economic development
Amahuaca people hunt, fish, farm, and work in the lumber and oil industries or as domestic servants. They harvest and process Brazil nuts.

Notes

Further reading
 Amahuaca tribe 
 Dole, Gertrude E. "Amahuaca."

External links
Amahuaca art, National Museum of the American Indian
Amahuaca, Countries and Their Cultures

Indigenous peoples of the Amazon
Indigenous peoples in Brazil
Indigenous peoples in Peru